Agnostic atheism is a philosophical position that encompasses both atheism and agnosticism. Agnostic atheists are atheistic because they do not hold a belief in the existence of any deity, and are agnostic because they claim that the existence of a demiurgic entity or entities is either unknowable in principle or currently unknown in fact.

The agnostic atheist may be contrasted with the agnostic theist, who believes that one or more deities exist but claims that the existence or nonexistence of such is unknown or cannot be known.

History 

One of the earliest definitions of agnostic atheism is that of theologian and philosopher Robert Flint, in his Croall Lecture of 1887–1888 (published in 1903 under the title Agnosticism).

The atheist may however be, and not unfrequently is, an agnostic. There is an agnostic atheism or atheistic agnosticism, and the combination of atheism with agnosticism which may be so named is not an uncommon one.

If a man has failed to find any good reason for believing that there is a God, it is perfectly natural and rational that he should not believe that there is a God; and if so, he is an atheist... if he goes farther, and, after an investigation into the nature and reach of human knowledge, ending in the conclusion that the existence of God is incapable of proof, cease to believe in it on the ground that he cannot know it to be true, he is an agnostic and also an atheist – an agnostic-atheist – an atheist because an agnostic... while, then, it is erroneous to identify agnosticism and atheism, it is equally erroneous so to separate them as if the one were exclusive of the other...

In 1885 Robert G. Ingersoll, popularly known as "The Great Agnostic", explained his comparative view of agnosticism and atheism as follows:

Epistemological arguments 

Epistemological, or agnostic, atheism argues that people cannot know a God or determine the existence of a God. The foundation of epistemological atheism is agnosticism, which takes a variety of forms. In the philosophy of immanence, divinity is inseparable from the world itself, including a person's mind, and each person's consciousness is locked in the subject. According to this form of agnosticism, this limitation in perspective prevents any objective inference from belief in a god to assertions of its existence.

The rationalistic agnosticism of Kant and the Enlightenment only accepts knowledge deduced with human rationality; this form of atheism holds that gods are not discernible as a matter of principle, and therefore cannot be known to exist. Skepticism, based on the ideas of Hume, asserts that certainty about anything is impossible, so one can never know for sure whether or not a god exists. Hume, however, held that such unobservable metaphysical concepts should be rejected as "sophistry and illusion". The allocation of agnosticism to atheism is disputed; it can also be regarded as an independent, basic worldview.

Other arguments for atheism that can be classified as epistemological or ontological, including logical positivism and ignosticism, assert the meaninglessness or unintelligibility of basic terms such as "God" and statements such as "God is all-powerful." Theological noncognitivism holds that the statement "God exists" does not express a proposition, but is nonsensical or cognitively meaningless. It has been argued both ways as to whether such individuals can be classified into some form of atheism or agnosticism. Philosophers A. J. Ayer and Theodore M. Drange reject both categories, stating that both camps accept "God exists" as a proposition; they instead place noncognitivism in its own category.

References

Further reading 

 Howe, Frederic R. Challenge and Response. Grand Rapids: The Zondervan Corporation, 1982. 
 Martin, Michael. Theism. MSN Encarta, 2000. Microsoft Corporation.
 Martin, Michael. Atheism: A Philosophical Justification. Philadelphia: Temple UP, 1992. 
 Smith, George H. Atheism: The Case Against God. 1st ed. Amherst: Prometheus Books, 1980. 
 Stein, Gordon. The Encyclopedia of Unbelief. Amherst: Prometheus Books, 1985. 
 
 Richard Dawkins, "The poverty of agnosticism", in The God Delusion, Black Swan, 2007.
 
 
 
 
 
 
 
 Bradlaugh, Charles, Annie Besant and others. (1884) The Atheistic Platform: 12 Lectures. London: Freethought Publishing. 
 
 
 
 
 
 
 
 
 Howson, Colin (2011). Objecting to God. Cambridge: Cambridge University Press. 
 
 
 
 
 
 
 
 
 
 
 
 
 
 
 
 
 Rosenberg, Alex (2011). The Atheist's Guide to Reality: Enjoying Life Without Illusions. New York: W. W. Norton & Co. 
 
 
 
 Walters, Kerry (2010). Atheism: A Guide for the Perplexed. New York: Continuum. 
 
 

Agnosticism
Atheism
Skepticism
Irreligion
Philosophy of religion